The Art of Insincerity is a debut album released by the Irish alternative rock sextet, Royseven. It was recorded at Grouse Lodge studio and released on 20 October 2006, reaching #17 in the Irish Albums Chart.

The single "Happy Ever Afters" was performed on Tubridy Tonight on 4 November 2006, a show that featured a selection of comic and political guests in the form of Mario Rosenstock, John & Richard Bruton and Des Bishop.

Track listing

References

External links 
 Official sites: English language German language
 Album review on CLUAS
 Praise from Spirit Store

2006 debut albums
Royseven albums